Billy Fox (3 January 1939 – 12 March 1974) was an Irish Fine Gael politician who served as a Senator for the Cultural and Educational Panel from 1973 to 1974 and a Teachta Dála (TD) for the Monaghan constituency from 1969 to 1973.

He was shot dead by IRA gunmen who were carrying out a raid on his girlfriend's farmhouse. Five members of the Provisional IRA were convicted of involvement in his murder.

Political career
A member of the Fine Gael party, Fox was first elected to Monaghan County Council in 1967, and as a Fine Gael TD to the 19th Dáil for the Monaghan constituency at the 1969 general election. He lost his seat at 1973 general election, but later that year he was elected to the 13th Seanad as a Senator for the Cultural and Educational Panel. Fox was also one of a handful of members of the Oireachtas from the minority Protestant community.

Fox came to prominence when he campaigned against the British Army's cratering of border roads and its use of CS gas and rubber bullets. On one occasion, he brought CS gas canisters and rubber bullets into the Dáil chamber and berated the Fianna Fáil Government's policy on Northern Ireland. He was forcibly removed from the Dáil and the incident made front-page news.

Death
On the night of Monday 11 March 1974, about a dozen gunmen arrived at the home of Senator Fox's girlfriend, Marjorie Coulson. She lived there with her parents and brother, and Senator Fox regularly visited on Monday evenings. The farmhouse was in the rural townland of Tircooney in County Monaghan, near the border between Ireland and Northern Ireland. The gunmen searched the farmhouse and demanded the occupants hand over weapons. As this was taking place, Senator Fox drove down the laneway and was stopped by some of the gunmen who were outside. He ran, but was shot and killed by a single gunshot wound through the upper torso. The gunmen then ordered everyone out of the house, set it on fire, and escaped.

The next day, the Ulster Freedom Fighters claimed that it had killed Senator Fox because he had links to the Provisional IRA. The IRA issued a statement saying that it was not involved, adding that "Mr Fox was known personally to a number of the leadership of the republican movement". However, shortly after the shooting, five men from County Monaghan were charged with Senator Fox's murder and IRA membership. They were convicted in May 1974 and sentenced to penal servitude for life. One of those convicted told the court they had raided the farm because they received a tip-off that UVF weapons were being stored there. He said there was an agreement that no shots were to be fired. His understanding was that Senator Fox had taken some of the men by surprise and they had shot to wound, not recognizing him. It was reported that the tip-off came from another local family and was the result of a grudge. IRA members were already suspicious that the UVF was receiving local help, following an incident in November 1973. Loyalist gunmen had bombed a house at nearby Legnakelly and shot one of the occupants, a republican activist. In its statement on Fox's killing, the IRA said "We have repeatedly drawn attention to the murderous acts of a group of former B Specials from Co. Fermanagh … led by serving officers of the British Army". The author Tim Pat Coogan, however, suggests that members of the Official IRA were responsible for killing Senator Fox.

The Seanad adjourned for a week as a mark of respect. About 500 people attended his funeral at Aughnamullen, including the Taoiseach and the Irish President, Erskine Childers. Fox was the first member of the Oireachtas to be killed since Minister for Justice Kevin O'Higgins by the anti-Treaty Irish Republican Army in 1927. When John Bruton first became a TD in 1969 he shared an office with Billy Fox. Bruton has said that he is still angry at the murder. The RTÉ documentary Rumours from Monaghan reported in detail on the circumstances of Fox's killing. Because Fox was a Protestant, several TDs have stated that the motive for the killing was sectarian.

One of those convicted for Fox's killing, Sean Kinsella, later escaped from Portlaoise Prison and was later convicted of arms offences and attempted murder in England. He was released by the Government of Ireland under the Good Friday Agreement.

The Senator Billy Fox Memorial Park in Latton is named in his memory. The Cavan-Monaghan Young Fine Gael branch was also named after him in his memory.

References

1939 births
1974 deaths
Politicians from County Monaghan
Irish Anglicans
Fine Gael TDs
Members of the 19th Dáil
Members of the 13th Seanad
Assassinated Irish politicians
People killed by the Provisional Irish Republican Army
Deaths by firearm in the Republic of Ireland
People murdered in the Republic of Ireland
Terrorism deaths in Ireland
Fine Gael senators
1974 murders in the Republic of Ireland